Walter Edward "Big Ed" Morris (December 7, 1899 – March 3, 1932) was an American baseball player who was murdered.

Early career
A native of Foshee, Alabama, Morris entered the majors in August 1922 with the Chicago Cubs, appearing for them in 12 innings of relief and did not have a decision. While pitching in the minors for Montgomery, he threw a no-hitter against Hershey. Morris returned to the major leagues in 1928, this time with the Boston Red Sox.

Later career
In 1928, Morris posted a 19–15 record with a 3.53 ERA and 104 strikeouts in 257⅔ innings for the last-place Red Sox, being considered in the American League MVP vote. In 1929 he went 14-14 with a 4.45 ERA, before injuring his arm during a scuffle in a St. Louis hotel elevator. After that, he went 4-9 in 1930 and 5-7 in 1931.

In a five-year career, Morris posted a 42–45 record with 256 strikeouts and a 4.19 ERA in 140 appearances, including 78 starts, 43 complete games, two shutouts, six saves, and 674.0 innings of work.

Death
Prior to 1932 spring training, some friends of Morris threw a going-away party for him in Century, Florida. The party got out of hand, and Morris got into an altercation with a gas station attendant who was at the tavern where the party was held. In the middle of the discussion, the man pulled out a knife and stabbed Morris in the chest. Morris was taken to a local hospital in critical condition and later died.

See also
 List of baseball players who died during their careers

References

External links
Ed Morris - Baseballbiography.com

Retrosheet

1899 births
1932 deaths
Major League Baseball pitchers
Male murder victims
Boston Red Sox players
Chicago Cubs players
People from Escambia County, Alabama
Baseball players from Alabama
People murdered in Florida
Deaths by stabbing in Florida
1932 murders in the United States
Nashville Vols players